Histiobranchus is a genus of eels in the family Synaphobranchidae.  It currently contains the following species:
 Histiobranchus australis (Regan, 1913)
 Histiobranchus bathybius (Deepwater arrowtooth eel)(Günther, 1877)
 Histiobranchus bruuni (Bruun's cutthroat eel)Castle, 1964

References

 

Synaphobranchidae
Ray-finned fish genera